Robertson is an outer-southern suburb in the City of Brisbane, Queensland, Australia.

Geography 

Robertson is loosely bounded by Kessels Road to the north, Mains Road to the east, Mccullough Street to the south, and Troughton Road to the west, but excludes the Sunnybank Plaza Shopping Centre to the south-east.

The land use is almost entirely residential.

History 
Robertson was named on 1 August 1967 by the Queensland Place Names Board in memory of Doctor William Nathaniel Robertson (1866-1938) who was a member of the University of Queensland Senate. He was also a foundation member of the Royal Australasian College of Surgeons.

In the mid-1960s Robertson was the unsubdivided southern part of Sunnybank, defined by Musgrave Road and a drive-in picture theatre at the corner of Musgrave and Troughton Roads. A shopping centre, Sunnybank Plaza, was opened in 1975 at the south-east corner of Robertson, and a State primary school in the middle of the suburb was opened in 1980. The population grew more than threefold to over 3000 between 1976 and 1986 as the Nathan campus of Griffith University (1975) developed. The primary school's enrolment topped 600 in 2002.

Sunnybank Plaza was refurbished and enlarged in 1989 and 1995, growing to 30,000 sq metres, with a Kmart, supermarkets, cinemas and 122 other shops.

Robertson State School opened on 29 January 1980 with 124 students. The Robertson State Preschool Centre opened two weeks later with an initial enrolment of 26. The school was officially opened by the Minister for Education, Val Bird, and by 1987 it had 600 students on roll.

Robertson's census populations have been:

Education

Robertson State School 
Robertson State School is a government primary (Prep-6) school for boys and girls at 688 Musgrave Road. In 2020, the school had an enrolment of 728 students with 50 teachers (46.3 full-time equivalent) and 31 non-teaching staff (18.4 full-time equivalent). It includes a special education program.

Student background 
The school is known for its high performing academic results, with a school ICSEA (Index of Community Socio-Educational Advantage) value of 1126 in comparison to the average of 1000. It scores a school ICSEA percentile of 91.

Students 
There are a total of 728 enrolments consisting of 355 boys (49%) and 373 girls (51%). 78% of all students have a language background other than English.

Secondary schools 
There are no secondary schools in Robertson. The nearest secondary schools are Sunnybank State High School in Sunnybank to the south and MacGregor State High School in MacGregor to the east. Many students, however, choose non-catchment partially selective schools such as Brisbane State High School, Mansfield State High School and Queensland Academies for Science, Mathematics and Technology (QASMT) due to their prestigious titles and quality in education.

Public Transport
Robertson is considered a location of reasonable public transport service. The Brisbane City Council bus lines 130 and 140 that pass through Mains Road at the 'Mains Road at Robertson bus stop', operated by Translink, the state public transport operating service, are run on a network of 'no timetable needed' high frequency buses known as Bus Upgrade Zone (BUZ) services.

According to the BCC, BUZ services operate daily:

 6am - 11.30pm 
 every 10 minutes or less during commuter peak times
 every 15 minutes or less at all other times.

BUZ Route 130 

The 130 bus line that runs from Drewvale/Parkinson is a direct express 'City express' service that runs through major commercial precincts and key destinations such as the Sunnybank Commercial Shopping Centre (Market Square), Queensland Sports and Athletics Centre (QSAC), or formerly known as QEII Stadium, Griffith University key interchange, Mater Hill busway station (Hospital), South bank busway station, Cultural Centre busway station and finally Queen Street bus station in the CBD of Brisbane.

BUZ Route 140 
The 40 bus line that runs from Browns Plains, Queensland is a direct express 'City express' service that runs through most main roads as the 130 bus line, however has altered commencement points. This service joins onto the South East Busway as well.

Other services 
Other services that run through Robertson are the 135 and 120, which both lead to the city. Other services available from the Mains Rd at Robertson bus stop are the P137, Creek St CBD express, the 139, direct link to the University of Queensland via the busway, and the 598 and 599, the Great Circle Lines passing through many suburbs in Brisbane.

Transportation overcrowding 

Overcrowding on the 130 and 140 bus lines have widely considered an issue for many students and residents in the suburb, and those neighbouring suburbs of Sunnybank, MacGregor, and Sunnybank Hills from 2006 to 2014. However, due to an increase in Translink fares increase, many resorted to privatised transportation, slowly emptying capacity and reducing demand for these public transport lines, being then reported as Australia's most expensive public transport system.

However, from 2019 to August 2021, ridership and patronage amongst these lines have slowly increased. Although many other lines throughout Brisbane have upgraded to Bi-articulated buses, the 130 and 140 have not received any upgrades, despite increase in patronage. The council has been unable to provide higher capacity vehicles, especially to cater for such demand during after-school rush from the South Bank busway station due to a high percentage of students from Brisbane State High School travelling on these services from 15:00 AEST to 15:30 AEST. Morning peak hour rush can also be uncomfortable, especially with increased patronage from the newly constructed QSAC Mains Road Park 'n' ride.

Images attached detail capacity of services.

2016 Census Data

The median age of people in Robertson (QLD) (State Suburbs) was 32 years. Children aged 0 – 14 years made up 14.0% of the population and people aged 65 years and over made up 15.6% of the population.

People — demographics & education 
People tables are based on a person's place of usual residence on Census night

In the 2016 Census, there were 4,973 people in Robertson (Qld) (State Suburbs). Of these 49.9% were male and 50.1% were female. Aboriginal and/or Torres Strait Islander people made up 0.3% of the population. 

The median age of people in Robertson (Qld) (State Suburbs) was 32 years. Children aged 0 – 14 years made up 14.0% of the population and people aged 65 years and over made up 15.6% of the population.

Of people in Robertson (Qld) (State Suburbs) aged 15 years and over, 49.1% were married and 6.3% were either divorced or separated.

In Robertson (Qld) (State Suburbs), of people aged 15 years and over, 45.3% of people were in a registered marriage and 4.3% were in a de facto marriage.

In Robertson (Qld) (State Suburbs), 37.5% of people were attending an educational institution. Of these, 16.3% were in primary school, 15.1% in secondary school and 49.7% in a tertiary or technical institution.

Of people aged 15 and over in Robertson (Qld) (State Suburbs), 23.7% reported having completed Year 12 as their highest level of educational attainment, 6.7% had completed a Certificate III or IV and 7.9% had completed an Advanced Diploma or Diploma.

2011 benchmarks are not available for this data item.

People — cultural & language diversity 

The most common ancestries in Robertson (Qld) (State Suburbs) were Chinese 33.1%, English 11.3%, Australian 9.5%, Indian 5.7% and Irish 4.3%.

Respondents had the option of reporting up to two ancestries on their Census form, and this is captured by the Ancestry Multi Response (ANCP) variable used in this table. Therefore, the total responses count will not equal the persons count for this area. Calculated percentages represent a proportion of all responses from people in Robertson (Qld) (State Suburbs) (including those who did not state an ancestry).

In Robertson (Qld) (State Suburbs), 32.9% of people were born in Australia. The most common countries of birth were China (excludes SARs and Taiwan) 17.2%, Taiwan 8.5%, India 6.4%, Hong Kong (SAR of China) 3.3% and Malaysia 2.8%.

In Robertson (Qld) (State Suburbs), 15.3% of people had both parents born in Australia and 73.5% of people had both parents born overseas.

In Robertson (Qld) (State Suburbs), the most common countries of birth for male parents were China (excludes SARs and Taiwan) 22.5%, Australia 18.7%, Taiwan 9.4%, India 7.4% and Vietnam 3.4%.

In Robertson (Qld) (State Suburbs), the most common countries of birth for female parents were China (excludes SARs and Taiwan) 22.4%, Australia 18.6%, Taiwan 10.1%, India 7.5% and Vietnam 3.6%.

The most common responses for religion in Robertson (Qld) (State Suburbs) were No Religion, so described 33.6%, Catholic 13.8%, Buddhism 7.9%, Not stated 7.0% and Anglican 6.3%. In Robertson (Qld) (State Suburbs), Christianity was the largest religious group reported overall (41.3%) (this figure excludes not stated responses).

In Robertson (Qld) (State Suburbs), 32.1% of people only spoke English at home. Other languages spoken at home included Mandarin 28.7%, Cantonese 7.7%, Korean 2.9%, Vietnamese 2.6% and Gujarati 2.3%.

People — employment 

There were 2,296 people who reported being in the labour force in the week before Census night in Robertson (Qld) (State Suburbs). Of these 48.0% were employed full time, 37.1% were employed part-time and 10.8% were unemployed.

The ABS Labour Force Survey provides the official estimates of Australia's unemployment rate. More information about Census and labour force status is provided in Understanding the Census and Census Data.
View the data quality statement for Labour force status (LFSP)

Of employed people in Robertson (Qld) (State Suburbs), 15.6% worked 1 to 15 hours, 15.3% worked 16 to 24 hours and 34.1% worked 40 hours or more.
View the data quality statement for Hours worked (HRSP)

The most common occupations in Robertson (Qld) (State Suburbs) included Professionals 27.5%, Managers 11.5%, Clerical and Administrative Workers 11.0%, Community and Personal Service Workers 10.8%, and Sales Workers 10.8%.
View the data quality statement for Occupation (OCCP)

Of the employed people in Robertson (Qld) (State Suburbs), 6.1% worked in Cafes and Restaurants. Other major industries of employment included Higher Education 4.7%, Hospitals (except Psychiatric Hospitals) 4.0%, Takeaway Food Services 3.5% and Supermarket and Grocery Stores 2.9%.
View the data quality statement for Industry of employment (INDP)

The median weekly personal income for people aged 15 years and over in Robertson (Qld) (State Suburbs) was $471.

View the data quality statements for: Total personal income (INCP) Total family income (FINF) Total household income (HIND)

In Robertson (Qld) (State Suburbs), on the day of the Census, the most common methods of travel to work for employed people were: Car, as driver 56.6%, Bus 13.2% and Car, as passenger 7.1%. Other common responses were Worked at home 5.1% and Walked only 3.8%. On the day, 16.7% of employed people used public transport (train, bus, ferry, tram/light rail) as at least one of their methods of travel to work and 65.8% used car (either as driver or as passenger).
View the data quality statement for Method of travel to work (MTWP)

In Robertson (Qld) (State Suburbs), of people aged 15 years and over, 62.0% did unpaid domestic work in the week before the Census. During the two weeks before the Census, 23.3% provided care for children and 10.3% assisted family members or others due to a disability, long term illness or problems related to old age. In the year before the Census, 17.8% of people did voluntary work through an organisation or a group.

Of people who did unpaid domestic work in the week before the Census in Robertson (Qld) (State Suburbs), 21.0% worked 5 to 14 hours, 9.9% worked 15 to 29 hours and 8.2% worked 30 hours or more.

References

External links

 
 ourbrisbane.com website, Robertson section

Suburbs of the City of Brisbane